Northeast Glacier is a steep, heavily crevassed glacier on the west side of Hemimont Plateau,  long and  wide at its mouth, which flows from McLeod Hill westward and then south-westwards into Marguerite Bay between the Debenham Islands and Roman Four Promontory, on the west coast of Graham Land, Antarctica. Northeast Glacier was first surveyed in 1936 by the British Graham Land Expedition (BGLE) under John Riddoch Rymill. It was resurveyed in 1940 by members of the United States Antarctic Service (USAS), who first used the glacier as a sledging route, and so named by them because it lay on the north-eastern side of their base at Stonington Island.

Yapeyú Refuge 
Yapeyú Refuge  is an Argentine Antarctic refuge nearby San Martín Base from which it depends. It is located on the Fallières Coast in the Antarctic Peninsula. The refuge was inaugurated on November 4, 1956, as logistical support and is administered by the Argentine Army. The shelter is located at 600 meters above the Northeast Glacier.

In 1956, during the installation of the San Martín Base, the Argentine Army built three refuges in order to have logistical support from Marguerite Bay, in the Bellingshausen Sea, to the Weddell Sea crossing the Antarctic Peninsula from west to east. The three refuges were built: the Chacabuco, the Yapeyú  and the Maipú. The project took 63 days, travelling about 786 kilometres using sled pulled by dogs. The refuge has food, equipment, medicines and fuel and was used for scientific projects carried out in the 1957-1958 International Geophysical Year. 
The refuge pay homage to Yapeyú, the birthplace of José de San Martín.

See also
 Blow-me-down Bluff
 List of glaciers in the Antarctic
 List of Antarctic field camps

References

Glaciers of Fallières Coast